Pier Francesco Battistelli (17th century) was an Italian painter active in the early-Baroque period, mainly in his hometown of Bologna, as well as Parma. He painted quadratura.

Biography
He was born in Pieve di Cento (Bologna) in the second half of the 16th century. He was a painter of architecture and adornment, "very well founded in quadrature and perspective" as Malvasia underlines. His activity, which took place mainly in the regions between Parma and Bologna, was documented only in the second and third decades of the seventeenth century. It consists, for the most part, of ornamental-decorative works that Battistelli executed on commission of the local lords, all equally engaged in the efforts to embellish their palaces according to the standards of the new perspective taste.

The first news that concerned him referred to the fresco that Battistelli performed in the dome of the sanctuary of the Madonna della Celletta, near Argenta, in 1613. This work, miraculously escaped the ruinous earthquake that struck the area in 1624, was unfortunately destroyed by the bombing of the Second World War.

From Farnese, at whose service he had been since 10 May 1618, he was invited to participate in the decoration of the Ducal Palace of Parma and later the Duke of Mirandola, wanting to decorate an entire hall of his palace, entrusted him with this task, imposing, however, to use the design that the Bolognese Francesco Brizzi had already prepared for this purpose.

The high esteem in which this artist was held, proven by positions of considerable responsibility and commitments of a certain importance, cannot be validated today by the direct study of the works, almost entirely lost during the numerous manipulations that the appointed buildings suffered.

Battistelli died in Bologna on March 16, 1625.

References

17th-century Italian painters
Italian male painters
Painters from Bologna
Italian Baroque painters
Quadratura painters